The 1916 United States presidential election in South Carolina took place on November 7, 1916, as part of the 1916 United States presidential election which was held throughout all contemporary 48 states. Voters chose 9 representatives, or electors to the Electoral College, who voted for president and vice president. 

South Carolina was won by the Democratic nominees, incumbent Democratic President Woodrow Wilson and Vice President Thomas R. Marshall. They defeated Republican nominee, U.S. Supreme Court Justice Charles Evans Hughes of New York, and his running mate Senator Charles W. Fairbanks of Indiana. 

Wilson won South Carolina by a landslide margin of 96.71%.

Results

References

South Carolina
1916
1916 South Carolina elections